Dysschema montezuma is a moth of the family Erebidae. It was described by Schaus in 1892. It is found in Mexico.

References

Dysschema
Moths described in 1892